Caneva is a surname. Notable people with the surname include:

 Carlo Caneva (1845 – 1922), Italian general
 Dalma Caneva (born 1994) Italian wrestler
 Don Caneva (1936 – 2008), American band director, conductor, music editor
 Romano Caneva (born 1904 -?), Italian boxer
 Giovanni Battista Caneva (1904 – 1947), Italian Fascist politician, syndicalist and athlete

See also 

 Caneva